Armutçuk  coal mine is a coal mine located in Turkey's Zonguldak basin.

References

External links 

 Armutçuk coal mine on Global Energy Monitor

Coal mines in Turkey
Zonguldak Province
Ereğli (Zonguldak)